is a town located in Nemuro Subprefecture, Hokkaido, Japan. As of September 30, 2016, it has an estimated population of 5,395, and an area of 397.88 km2.

The word "Rausu" originates from the Ainu word Raushi, roughly meaning "Low-land" or "Place of men with beast-like spirit".

The town occupies the southern half of the Shiretoko Peninsula. Kunashir Island, one of the four disputed Kuril Islands, can be seen from the town.

Geography
Rausu is located on the east end of Hokkaido's Shiretoko Peninsula.  It is situated on the southeast corner of the peninsula facing the Nemuro Strait. The town stretches along and narrow strip of land, extending  from southwest to northeast.  The Shiretoko mountain range extends north on the peninsula to the sea where it forms steep cliffs. The Shiretoko mountain range is the source for myriad rivers, that all empty into the sea.  Village communities are found mostly on the coast line at the mouths of these rivers. The "downtown" of Rausu is at the mouth of Rausu River where it joins the sea at Rausu Harbor.

Two access points to Rausu via highway are through Shibetsu in the south or through Shari on the west side of the Shiretoko Peninsula. From Shibetsu, National Highway 335（the Kunashiri Highway）extends northwards along the coast into Rausu at which point it crosses the peninsula heading west, over the Shiretoko mountain range (the Shiretoko Pass). The Shiretoko Pass leads into Shari and becomes National Highway 334 (Shiretoko Crossing).  Some sections of both highways (334 and 335) feature steep precipices just off the shoulder and may prove dangerous. There are also a number of tunnels along both highways.
 Mountains:  Mount Rausu (1,660m/ 1.03 miles); Mount Shiretoko Sulphur Spring (1,563m/ 0.97miles)
 Major rivers: Rausu River
 Major lakes and marshes: Lake Rausu

Climate

Adjoining municipalities 
 Nemuro Subprefecture
Shibetsu
 Okhotsk Subprefecture
Shari District: Shari

History 
1901 (Meiji 34) — Uebetsu Village split from Shibetsu.
1923 (Taishō 12) — Uebetsu becomes second-class municipality.
1930 (Shōwa 5) — Uebetsu is renamed Rausu Village.
1961 (Shōwa 36) — Rausu becomes the Rausu Town.

In 2004, there were talks held in Nakashibetsu amongst all the municipalities in the area to form one large township called East Shiretoko. Soon thereafter local residents were polled regarding the proposal. The faction in favor of this change did not receive support and thus abandoned the effort.

Local economy 
Rausu's local economy consists of three main sources: the fishing industry, Shiretoko tourism, and local businesses.

Fishing industry
Rausu is primarily a fishing town. One third of residents are supported by the fishing industry. The main intake by the fishing industry consists of kichiji rockfish (Sebastolobus macrochir), Alaska Pollock (Theragra chalcogramma), konbu kelp, salmon, squid, and sea urchin. Particularly famous is Rausu konbu (Rausu kelp). There is no other place in Japan to harvest sea urchin from winter to summer other than Rausu.
As for agriculture, in southern Rausu there is some dairy farming, but no land suitable for growing rice, produce, or other large scale agriculture. The lumber industry does not have much of a presence either (as it does in the rest of Hokkaido). 70% of the town's land is lush mountain forest, but it is mostly a part of the Shiretoko National Park.

Local business
Rausu's second major source of economic income is not any one specific industry, but rather the mix of local retail, municipal employment, food and beverage industry, etc.

Shiretoko National Park
The third major source of revenue for Rausu is related to Shiretoko National Park. The splendor of Shiretoko’s forests and the abundance of aquatic life in the Nemuro Strait form the basis of the local tourist industry.  Due to the widening of Kunashiri Highway, in recent years whale and dolphin watching have become popular in the summer, whereas viewing Steller’s sea eagle, white-tailed (sea) eagles, (earless) seals, and drift-ice are popular in the winter. These activities are usually done by chartered cruises that cater to researchers, photographers, and bird watchers.  Rausu is known for fresh rockfish, early-season salmon and salmon eggs, Alaskan pollock, squid, and sea urchin. The town has many bed-and-breakfasts, lodges, onsen hotels, restaurants, and bars.  There is also a roadside station that sells local Shiretoko-area products.

Local business groups
 Rausu Deep Ocean Fishing Association
 Rausu Fisherman’s Association

Financial institutions
 Daichi Credit Union, Rausu branch
 Rausu Post Office

Municipal services

Japan Post
 Rausu Post Office (serves as a distribution point for Nakashibetsu Japan Postal Service Center hub)
 Misaki-chō annex of the Rausu Post Office
 Yagihama annex of the Rausu Post Office
 Minehama limited-service mail center

Police force
 Rausu Police Department is a sub-station of Nakashibetsu Police Department

Japanese military/Coast Guard presence
Due to the close proximity of Russia and potential fishing-rights disputes, the Japanese Coast Guard maintains a presence in Rausu year round.  Coast Guard vessels are regularly docked in Rausu Harbor, with the personnel barracks nearby.
The Japanese Self-Defense Force maintains a permanent presence in the town.

Education system
Like most high schools in Japan, the local senior high school falls under the administration of the prefectural board of education, while the local middle and elementary schools are operated by the local board of education.

Senior high schools
 Rausu Senior High School

Middle/junior high schools
 Shunshō Middle School
 Rausu Middle School
 Chienbetsu Middle School 
 Uebetsu Middle School 
 Tobinitai Middle School

Elementary schools 
 Shunshō Elementary School
 Rausu Elementary School
 Uebetsu Elementary School 
 Tobinitai Middle School 

The Rausu Board of Education has participated in the Ministry of Education, Culture, Sports, Science and Technology's (MEXT) Japan Exchange and Teaching (JET) Programme since summer 1993.  The JET program helps place native English speakers in both prefectural and local boards of education to work as Assistant Language Teachers (ALT) with the goal of developing Japan's foreign language education.

Transportation

Airports
 Nemuro-Nakashibetsu Airport (Nakashibetsu, Hokkaido)

Buses 
 There is a regional bus route from Kushiro Eki-Mae Station to the center of Rausu operated by Akan Bus.  Service is limited to four round-trip journeys a day.
 There is a line from Utoro Onsen in Shari to Rausu during the summer operated by the regional Shari Bus and Akan Bus companies.

Major roads

National highways 
 National Highway 334 
 National Highway 335

Prefectural highways 
 Hokkaidō Route 87 (Shiretoko National Park—Rausu Drive)

Roadside stations 
 Shiretoko-Rausu

Scenic and historical places

Festivals/events
Rausu observes most of the same national Japanese traditional holidays found throughout the country, such as Children's Day, Hatsumōde, etc.  However, some festivals, like O-bon and Coming of Age Day are celebrated earlier due to the fishing industry and the large number of college students enrolled in schools in Honshū. Other annual festivals/events include: 
 Isaribi Festival 漁火祭り (mid-September)
 Rausu Ekiden Race (October)
 Rausu Art and Culture Festival (early to mid-November)
 Middle School Sports Day (first weekend of June)
 Elementary School Field Day (second weekend of June)
 Shiretoko Biraki Festival 知床開き祭り (late June): a fireworks, yosakoi, and traditional dance festival celebrating summer
 Rausu Shrine Festival 神社祭, jinja-sai (July 1–3): a Shintō mikoshi festival unique to Rausu

World Cultural and Natural Heritage (UNESCO) 
 Shiretoko Park (UNESCO World Heritage Site)
 Rausu Luminous Moss – roped-off walking path to guide visitors through this natural site
 Rausu Geyser – marked trail/designated viewing area for visitors
 Shiretoko Ibuki-Taru Club – percussion group that plays casks made of Chinese juniper, using wooden mallets as beaters (almost like Japanese taiko drums.)
 Remains of the former Uebetsu Shrine – a Rausu historical site
 Remains of Kyuuemon Kan (久右衛門の澗)

Sightseeing 
 Rausu National Park
 Mt. Rausu
 Shiokaze “Sea Breeze” Park – located at Rausu harbor.  From here one can view the Northern Territories (now a part of Russia).
 Luminous Moss (a protected moss-species) – the novel Hikari Goke is about this site
 Rausu Onsen: kuma no yu, or “bear hot-spring”
 From the television series, “Kita no Kuni Kara: 2002 Yuigon” (“From the Northern Country: Last Word 2002”) there is the restaurant Jun no Banya (also known as Kamoiunbe-gawa)
 Seseki Onsen – an onsen on the coast that is only accessible at low tide (it is submerged at high tide). It was also used as a location in the Japanese TV drama “Kita no Kuni Kara: 2002 Yuigon”.
 Aidomari Onsen
 Shiretoko Point
 Whale & dolphin watching – accessible via a variety of charted tour boats
 Free campsites

Other

Famous people
 Toyoshima Yukari 豊島由佳梨 – actress, singer
 Ishii Eiji 石井英二 - nature & wildlife videographer

References

External links

 Official Website 
 Shiretoko-Rausu Tourism Website 

 
Towns in Hokkaido
1901 establishments in Japan